The Harvard–Penn football rivalry is an American college football rivalry between the Harvard Crimson and Penn Quakers. The first game was played in 1881.

In the first 18 games played in this 88 game series, Harvard won 13 and Penn won 5. In 1958 Penn pulled even with 14 games won by each school. There was 1 tie (1940). From 1959 through 1981 Harvard dominated the series winning 20 games to Penn's winning 2 games (1963, 1972). There was 1 tie (1965). However, in recent years the Harvard–Penn football game in mid-November has usually had Ivy League Football Championship connotations. Since 1982 Harvard and Penn have won 29 Ivy League Football Championships between them. Penn has won 17 and Harvard has won 12. Penn has been undefeated 8 times in the Ivy League and Harvard has been undefeated 6 times in the Ivy League during this time span. Since 1982 Penn has defeated Harvard 23 times and Harvard has defeated Penn 17 times.

Game results

See also  
 List of NCAA college football rivalry games

References

College football rivalries in the United States
Harvard Crimson football
Penn Quakers football